Pingasa rubicunda is a species of moth of the family Geometridae first described by William Warren in 1894. It is found in northern India, Sundaland and the Philippines.

The larvae have been recorded feeding on the flowers of Shorea species.

References

External links

Moths described in 1894
Pseudoterpnini